James Edward Lee Marsland (born 28 November 1989), known professionally as James Hype  is an English DJ, producer and remix artist from The Wirral. He attended Calday Grange Grammar School and lived in Greasby whilst growing up.

He is best known for “who does this?” and his 2022 single "Ferrari" which reached number one on the charts of the Netherlands, Italy and Belgium.

James presented a late night radio show on Thursday nights on KISS FM from July 2017 to November 2019. James is an ambassador for DJ equipment manufacturer Pioneer DJ and features in their online videos.

Stereohype 

James Hype is the founder of the Stereohype label, which was first active in 2020. Releases include those of producers R3WIRE, Tita Lau, Zurra, Dots Per Inch, Roxe and More Than Friends.

Discography

Singles

Remixes
 2021: Felix Jaehn and Robin Schulz featuring Georgia Ku – "I Got a Feeling"

References

External links

James Hype on Beatport
James Hype on Twitch
James Hype on YouTube
James Hype on Steam
James Hype on Instagram   

English electronic musicians
English DJs
English record producers
1989 births
Living people
Musicians from Liverpool
Electronic dance music DJs